Irvington Bus Terminal is a regional bus terminus located at 1085 Clinton Avenue in Irvington, New Jersey. It is owned and operated by New Jersey Transit (NJT) and is served by buses traveling to Newark and other points in Essex County, to Union and Passaic counties, and to the Port Authority Bus Terminal in Midtown Manhattan. The terminal was originally built in 1947 and underwent significant renovation and expansion in the early 2000s. It is one of the NJT's busiest facilities, daily serving over 12,500 passengers with more than 450 bus trips. and is origination/termination point for one of Greater Newark's bus rapid transit (BRT) lines. In July 2015, the central business district around the terminal was designated a transit village, qualifying it for incentives for revitalization.

Service

Service to the 94 is also available at New St. and Springfield Ave, west of the terminal. With services to Bloomfield Center, Union Township, Linden and Route 22.

References

External links 
 Wikimapia

NJ Transit bus stations
Transportation buildings and structures in Essex County, New Jersey
Surface transportation in Greater New York
Transit hubs serving New Jersey
Bus transportation in New Jersey
Clock towers in New Jersey
Irvington, New Jersey